Pachnamunis (Greek: , , or ) was a major town of the nome of Sebennytos in the Egyptian Delta. It stood at approximately latitude 31° 6′ North on the eastern shore of Lake Butos. It was destroyed by the Ottoman Caliphate and is now called .

See also
 List of ancient Egyptian towns and cities

References

Former populated places in Egypt